The 2021–22 Louisiana Tech Bulldogs basketball team represented Louisiana Tech University during the 2021–22 NCAA Division I men's basketball season. The team were led by seventh-year head coach Eric Konkol, and played their home games at Thomas Assembly Center in Ruston, Louisiana as a members of the West Division of Conference USA.

Previous season
The Bulldogs finished the 2020–21 season 24–8, 12–4 in C-USA play to win the West Division. They defeated Florida Atlantic in the quarterfinals of the C-USA tournament before losing to North Texas. They received a bid to the National Invitation Tournament, where they lost to Mississippi State, but then defeated Colorado State in the third place game.

Offseason

Departures

Incoming transfers

Recruiting class of 2021

Recruiting class of 2022

Roster

Schedule and results

|-
!colspan=9 style=| Exhibition

|-
!colspan=9 style=| Non-confrerence regular season

|-
!colspan=9 style=| Conference USA regular season

|-
!colspan=9 style=| Conference USA tournament

Source

See also
 2021–22 Louisiana Tech Lady Techsters basketball team

References

Louisiana Tech Bulldogs basketball seasons
Louisiana Tech
Louisiana Tech basketball
Louisiana Tech basketball